Wharepapa South  is a rural community in the Waipa District and Waikato region of New Zealand's North Island. It is located west of Putāruru and east of Te Awamutu.

The local Aotearoa Marae and Hoturoa or Rangikawa meeting house is a meeting place for the Ngāti Raukawa hapū of Ngāti Takihiku, and the Waikato Tainui hapū of Ngāti Korokī and Ngāti Raukawa ki Panehākua.

Education

References

Waipa District
Populated places in Waikato
Populated places on the Waikato River